Killeagh railway station served the town of Killeagh in County Cork, Ireland.

History

The station opened on 17 February 1860. Regular passenger services were withdrawn on 4 February 1963.

The line was closed to all goods traffic except wagonload on 2 December 1974, closed to wagonload traffic except beet on 2 June 1978 and to beet traffic on 30 August 1982.

Routes

Further reading

References

Disused railway stations in County Cork
Railway stations opened in 1860
Railway stations closed in 1963